The Keystone Library Network (KLN), founded in 1998, is a consortium of 18 libraries, including the 14 Pennsylvania State System of Higher Education's university libraries. The KLN provides its libraries with abstracts and access to 6,739 full-text journals and 10,000 business reports including country reports, industry reports, market research reports, and SWOT analyses.

The KLN maintains library catalogs of its members' holdings through Pennsylvania Inter-Library Online Technology (PILOT). The KLN enables users at each library to simultaneously search a group of shared resources provided by the KLN in addition to searching the individual library's locally subscribed resources.

Member libraries
Bloomsburg University – Harvey A. Andruss Library
California University of Pennsylvania – Louis L. Manderino Library
Cheyney University – Leslie Pinckney Hill Library
Clarion University – Carlson Library
Suhr Library
East Stroudsburg University – Kemp Library
Edinboro University – Baron-Forness Library
Geneva College – McCartney Library
Harrisburg University – Harrisburg University of Science and Technology Library
Indiana University of Pennsylvania – Libraries
Cogswell Music Library
Rhoades B. Stabley Library
Patrick J. Stapleton Library
Lincoln University (Pennsylvania) – Langston Hughes Memorial Library
Kutztown University – Rohrbach Library
Lock Haven University – Stevenson Library
Mansfield University – North Hall Library
Millersville University – Helen A. Ganser Library
Shippensburg University – Lehman Library
Slippery Rock University – Bailey Library
Pennsylvania Department of Education – State Library of Pennsylvania
West Chester University – Library Services
 Francis Harvey Green Library
 Presser Music Library

External links

Library consortia in Pennsylvania
1998 establishments in Pennsylvania